Fred Windemere (born Fritz Wintermeier, April 15, 1892 –March 18, 1970) was an American actor and film director of the silent era.

Selected filmography
 Three in Exile (1925)
 With This Ring (1925)
 Romance Road (1925)
 Soiled (1925)
 The Verdict (1925)
 Morganson's Finish (1926)
 The Taxi Mystery (1926)
 Broadway After Midnight (1927)
 She's My Baby (1927)
 Devil Dogs (1928)
 Broadway Daddies (1928)

References

Bibliography
 Munden, Kenneth White. The American Film Institute Catalog of Motion Pictures Produced in the United States, Part 1. University of California Press, 1997.

External links

1892 births
1970 deaths
American male film actors
American film directors
People from Iowa